William A. Ragsdale House, also known as Pine Hall, is a historic home located at Bedford, Lawrence County, Indiana.  It was built in 1865, and is a two-story, Italianate / Second Empire style brick dwelling on a limestone block foundation.  It features a -story projecting entry tower with a mansard roof.

It was listed in the National Register of Historic Places in 2002.

References

Houses on the National Register of Historic Places in Indiana
Italianate architecture in Indiana
Second Empire architecture in Indiana
Houses completed in 1865
Buildings and structures in Lawrence County, Indiana
National Register of Historic Places in Lawrence County, Indiana